It was a Dacian fortified town.

References

Dacian fortresses in Tulcea County
Historic monuments in Tulcea County
History of Dobruja